"So Gently We Go" is a song by Canadian rock band I Mother Earth, released as a single from their debut studio album, Dig. The song reached #1 on Canada's CANCON chart.

Track listing
US Version
 So Gently We Go (Edit) - 3:59
 Not Quite Sonic (LP Version) - 5:55
 Levitate (Acoustic Version) - 4:36
 So Gently We Go (Acoustic Version) - 5:10
 Subterranean Wonderland - 8:06

Charts

References

External links

1994 singles
I Mother Earth songs
1993 songs
EMI Records singles